The 1918 All-Ireland Senior Hurling Championship Final was the thirty-first All-Ireland Final and the culmination of the 1918 All-Ireland Senior Hurling Championship, an inter-county hurling tournament for the top teams in Ireland. Limerick were the winners.

References
 Corry, Eoghan, The GAA Book of Lists (Hodder Headline Ireland, 2005).
 Donegan, Des, The Complete Handbook of Gaelic Games (DBA Publications Limited, 2005).

1
All-Ireland Senior Hurling Championship Finals
Limerick GAA matches
Wexford GAA matches
All-Ireland Senior Hurling Championship Final
All-Ireland Senior Hurling Championship Final, 1918